The Dieksee is a lake in the Holstein Switzerland region of North Germany.

Geography 

This waterway links the Dieksee to the other lakes in the Holstein Lake District (the Kleiner- and Großer Eutiner See, the Kellersee, the Großen- and Kleinen Plöner See and the Ukleisee).

Like the rest of Holstein Switzerland, the Dieksee was formed during the last ice age. Dead-ice was preserved in the hollow thus formed; when that melted the lake was formed.

Recreation 
Boats may use the lake and pleasure boats (run by 5-Seen-Fahrt) link the largest villages of the Holstein lake district. In the villages of Malente-Gremsmühlen, Niederkleveez and Timmdorf there are jetties on the Dieksee. There is a circular walk and cycle path around lake which is about 14 kilometres long. From the Holzberg Tower there is a good overview of the Dieksee, the lake's islands of Langenwarder and Gremswarder and the other lakes in the region.

See also 
List of lakes in Schleswig-Holstein

External links

Data on the Dieksee at umweltdaten.landsh.de 
Stephan, H.J. (2003) Zur Entstehung der eiszeitlichen Landschaft Schleswig-Holsteins (The Formation of the Ice-Age Landscape of Schleswig-Holstein) 

Lakes of Schleswig-Holstein
SDieksee